Ibrahima Mbaye (born 19 November 1994) is a Senegalese professional footballer who plays as a right-back.

Club career 

Mbaye was born in Guédiawaye, a suburb of Dakar, Senegal. He joined youth football academy Étoile Lusitana before being signed by Italian club Internazionale in summer 2010. Mbaye formally joined Inter in January 2011 following his 16th birthday and entered the Inter U17 youth squad. In 2011–12, Mbaye was promoted to Inter Primavera, the club's reserve team coached by Andrea Stramaccioni. The primavera team won the 2011–12 NextGen Series under Stramaccioni and the league under Daniele Bernazzani, after Stramaccioni was promoted to first team coach. Stramaccioni then promoted Mbaye to the first team on 28 April 2012. However, the footballer was initially excluded from the team line-up, including the bench.

In July 2012, Stramaccioni named Mbaye in Inter's pre-season training camp. The squad consisted of 26 players who were not involved in the UEFA Euro 2012 tournament. Mbaye played in pre-season friendlies, winning the 2012 TIM Trophy. On 27 July 2012, Mbaye was named in List B—Inter's main squad for 2012–13 UEFA Europa League—as he was not yet eligible for List A. Mbaye made his debut in the return leg of the third qualifying round after Inter had defeated Hajduk Split 3–0 away. Yuto Nagatomo was rested and Mbaye occupied the left-back position. However, in September, Mbaye was dropped from the squad for the group stage as there was no room for him in the quota of 17 foreign players.

A few weeks after his 18th birthday, Mbaye signed a new contract with Inter.

On 23 January 2015, Mbaye was signed on loan by Bologna until the end of the season, with obligation to buy set at €3 million, depending on whether or not the club was promoted to Serie A next season. Bologna was promoted to Serie A at the end of the season, with Mbaye playing a major role in returning the club to the Italian top league. He was offered a contract to stay permanently at Bologna, leaving Inter Milan after more than five years.

On 1 September 2022, his contract with Bologna was terminated by mutual consent.

International career 

Mbaye made his international debut in October 2014 during the 2015 Africa Cup of Nations qualifiers. He was called up by head coach Alain Giresse for the game against Tunisia in Dakar. He was then re-called for the return leg game in Tunis, where Senegal lost 1–0 despite dominating the game. Mbaye earned his third international cap a few weeks later when Senegal faced Egypt in Cairo. They won the game 1–0 and Senegal qualified to the 2015 Africa Cup of Nations competition with one game against Malawi left to play, in which Mbaye also featured In total, he has earned four international caps with the Lions of Teranga and is the youngest Senegalese player to ever wear the national jersey.

Career statistics

Club

International

Honours 
Senegal U20

 Jeux de la Francophonie bronze medalist: 2013

Senegal

 Africa Cup of Nations: 2021

References

External links 
 Inter profile 

1994 births
Living people
People from Dakar Region
Senegalese footballers
Association football defenders
Senegal international footballers
2021 Africa Cup of Nations players
Africa Cup of Nations-winning players
Serie A players
Serie B players
Liga I players
Liga III players
Inter Milan players
U.S. Livorno 1915 players
Bologna F.C. 1909 players
CFR Cluj players
Senegalese expatriate footballers
Senegalese expatriate sportspeople in Italy
Expatriate footballers in Italy
Senegalese expatriate sportspeople in Romania
Expatriate footballers in Romania